Diuranium pentoxide (uranium(V) oxide) is an inorganic chemical compound of uranium and oxygen.

References

Uranium(V) compounds
Oxides